This is a list of foreign ministers in 1995.

Africa
 Algeria - Mohamed Salah Dembri (1993-1996)
 Angola - Venâncio da Silva Moura (1992-1999)
 Benin -
Robert Dossou (1993-1995)
Edgar Yves Monnou (1995-1996)
 Botswana - Mompati Merafhe (1994-2008)
 Burkina Faso - Ablassé Ouedraogo (1994-1999)
 Burundi -
Jean-Marie Ngendahayo (1993-1995)
Paul Munyembari (1995)
Vénérand Bakevyumusaya (1995-1996)
 Cameroon - Ferdinand Oyono (1992-1997)
 Cape Verde -
Manuel Casimiro de Jesus Chantre (1993-1995)
José Tomás Veiga (1995-1996)
 Central African Republic - Simon Bedaya-Ngaro (1993-1996)
 Chad - Ahmat Abderahmane Haggar (1994-1996)
 Comoros -
Said Mohamed Sagaf (1994-1995)
Mohamed Abdoulwahab (1995)
Abdallah Mouzaoir (1995-1996)
 Congo -
Benjamin Bounkoulou (1992-1995)
Arsène Tsaty-Boungou (1995-1997)
 Côte d'Ivoire - Amara Essy (1990-2000)
 Djibouti -
Mohamed Bolock Abdou (1993-1995)
Mohamed Moussa Chehem (1995-1999)
 Egypt - Amr Moussa (1991-2001)
 Equatorial Guinea - Miguel Oyono Ndong Mifumu (1993-1999)
 Eritrea - Petros Solomon (1994-1997)
 Ethiopia - Seyoum Mesfin (1991-2010)
 Gabon - Casimir Oyé-Mba (1994-1999)
 The Gambia -
Bolong Sonko (1994-1995)
Baboucarr-Blaise Jagne (1995-1997)
 Ghana - Obed Asamoah (1981-1997)
 Guinea - Kozo Zoumanigui (1994-1996)
 Guinea-Bissau -
Bernardino Cardoso (1992-1995)
Ansumane Mané (1995-1996)
 Kenya - Kalonzo Musyoka (1993-1998)
 Lesotho -
Molapo Qhobela (1994-1995)
Mpho Malie (1995)
Kelebone Maope (1995-1998)
 Liberia -
Dorothy Musuleng-Cooper (1994-1995)
Momolu Sirleaf (1995-1996)
 Libya - Umar Mustafa al-Muntasir (1992-2000)
 Madagascar - Jacques Sylla (1993-1996)
 Malawi - Edward Bwanali (1994-1996)
 Mali - Dioncounda Traoré (1994-1997)
 Mauritania - Mohamed Salem Ould Lekhal (1994-1996)
 Mauritius -
Ramduthsing Jaddoo (1994-1995)
Paul Bérenger (1995-1997)
 Morocco - Abdellatif Filali (1985-1999)
 Western Sahara -
Mohamed Salem Ould Salek (1988-1995)
Malainine Sadik (1995-1997)
 Mozambique - Leonardo Simão (1994-2005)
 Namibia - Theo-Ben Gurirab (1990-2002)
 Niger -
Abdourahmane Hama (1993-1995)
Mohamed Bazoum (1995-1996)
 Nigeria -
Baba Gana Kingibe (1993-1995)
Tom Ikimi (1995-1998)
 Rwanda - Anastase Gasana (1994-1999)
 São Tomé and Príncipe - Guilherme Posser da Costa (1994-1996)
 Senegal - Moustapha Niasse (1993-1998)
 Seychelles - Danielle de St. Jorre (1989-1997)
 Sierra Leone -
Abass Bundu (1994-1995)
Alusine Fofanah (1995-1996)
 Somalia - no central government
 Somaliland - ?
 South Africa - Alfred Baphethuxolo Nzo (1994-1999)
 Sudan -
Hussein Suleiman Abu Saleh (1993-1995)
Ali Osman Taha (1995-1998)
 Swaziland -
Solomon Dlamini (1993-1995)
Arthur Khoza (1995-1998)
 Tanzania -
Joseph Rwegasira (1993-1995)
Jakaya Kikwete (1995-2006)
 Togo -
Boumbéra Alassounouma (1994-1995)
Barry Moussa Barqué (1995-1996)
 Tunisia - Habib Ben Yahia (1991-1997)
 Uganda - Ruhakana Rugunda (1994-1996)
 Zaire -
Lunda Bululu (1994-1995)
Gérard Kamanda Wa Kamanda (1995-1996)
 Zambia -
Remmy Mushota (1994-1995)
Christon Tembo (1995-1996)
 Zimbabwe -
Nathan Shamuyarira (1987-1995)
Stan Mudenge (1995-2005)

Asia
 Afghanistan - Najibullah Lafraie (1994-1996)
 Armenia - Vahan Papasyan (1993-1996)
 Azerbaijan - Hasan Hasanov (1993-1998)
 Nagorno-Karabakh - Arkadi Ghukasyan (1993-1997)
 Bahrain - Sheikh Muhammad ibn Mubarak ibn Hamad Al Khalifah (1971-2005)
 Bangladesh - A.S.M. Mostafizur Rahman (1991-1996)
 Bhutan - Dawa Tsering (1972-1998)
 Brunei - Pengiran Muda Mohamed Bolkiah (1984–2015)
 Cambodia - Ung Huot (1994-1998)
 China - Qian Qichen (1988-1998)
 Georgia -
Aleksandre Chikvaidze (1992-1995)
Irakli Menagarishvili (1995-2003)
 Abkhazia - Leonid Lakerbaia (1995-1996)
 India -
Dinesh Singh (1993-1995)
Pranab Mukherjee (1995-1996)
 Indonesia - Ali Alatas (1988-1999)
 Iran - Ali Akbar Velayati (1981-1997)
 Iraq - Muhammad Saeed al-Sahhaf (1992-2001)
 Israel -
Shimon Peres (1992-1995)
Yossi Beilin (1995)
Ehud Barak (1995-1996)
 Japan - Yōhei Kōno (1994-1996)
 Jordan -
Abdelsalam al-Majali (1994-1995)
Abdul Karim al-Kabariti (1995-1997)
 Kazakhstan - Kassym-Jomart Tokayev (1994-1999)
 North Korea - Kim Yong-nam (1983-1998)
 South Korea - Gong Ro-myeong (1994-1996)
 Kuwait - Sheikh Sabah Al-Ahmad Al-Jaber Al-Sabah (1978-2003)
 Kyrgyzstan - Roza Otunbayeva (1994-1997)
 Laos - Somsavat Lengsavad (1993-2006)
 Lebanon - Farès Boueiz (1992-1998)
 Malaysia - Abdullah Ahmad Badawi (1991-1999)
 Maldives - Fathulla Jameel (1978-2005)
 Mongolia - Tserenpiliyn Gombosüren (1988-1996)
 Myanmar - Ohn Gyaw (1991-1998)
 Nepal -
Madhav Kumar Nepal (1994-1995)
Prakash Chandra Lohani (1995-1997)
 Oman - Yusuf bin Alawi bin Abdullah (1982–2020)
 Pakistan - Aseff Ahmad Ali (1993-1996)
 Philippines -
Roberto Romulo (1992-1995)
Domingo Siazon, Jr. (1995-2001)
 Qatar - Sheikh Hamad bin Jassim bin Jaber Al Thani (1992-2013)
 Saudi Arabia - Prince Saud bin Faisal bin Abdulaziz Al Saud (1975–2015)
 Singapore - S. Jayakumar (1994-2004)
 Sri Lanka - Lakshman Kadirgamar (1994-2001)
 Syria - Farouk al-Sharaa (1984-2006)
 Taiwan - Fredrick Chien (1990-1996)
 Tajikistan - Talbak Nazarov (1994-2006)
 Thailand -
Thaksin Shinawatra (1994-1995)
Krasae Chanawongse (1995)
Kasem S. Kasemsri (1995-1996)
 Turkey -
Murat Karayalçın (1994-1995)
Erdal İnönü (1995)
Coşkun Kırca (1995)
Deniz Baykal (1995-1996)
 Turkmenistan - Boris Şyhmyradow (1995-2000)
 United Arab Emirates - Rashid Abdullah Al Nuaimi (1980-2006)
 Uzbekistan - Abdulaziz Komilov (1994-2003)
 Vietnam - Nguyễn Mạnh Cầm (1991-2000)
 Yemen - Abd al-Karim al-Iryani (1994-1998)

Australia and Oceania
 Australia - Gareth Evans (1988-1996)
 Fiji - Filipe Bole (1994-1997)
 Kiribati - Teburoro Tito (1994-2003)
 Marshall Islands - Phillip H. Muller (1994-2000)
 Micronesia - Resio S. Moses (1991-1996)
 Nauru -
Bernard Dowiyogo (1989-1995)
Lagumot Harris (1995-1996)
 New Zealand - Don McKinnon (1990-1999)
 Cook Islands - Inatio Akaruru (1989-1999)
 Palau - Andres Uherbelau (1994-1996)
 Papua New Guinea - Sir Julius Chan (1994-1996)
 Solomon Islands -
Francis Saemala (1994-1995)
Danny Philip (1995-1996)
 Tonga - Prince Tupouto'a Tungi (1979-1998)
 Tuvalu - Kamuta Latasi (1993-1996)
 Vanuatu -
Maxime Carlot Korman (1993-1995)
Alfred Maseng (1995-1996)
 Western Samoa - Tofilau Eti Alesana (1988-1998)

Europe
 Albania - Alfred Serreqi (1992-1996)
 Andorra - Manuel Mas Ribó (1994-1997)
 Austria -
Alois Mock (1987-1995)
Wolfgang Schüssel (1995-2000)
 Belarus - Uladzimir Syanko (1994-1997)
 Belgium -
Frank Vandenbroucke (1994-1995)
Erik Derycke (1995-1999)
 Brussels-Capital Region - Jos Chabert (1989-1999)
 Flanders - Luc Van den Brande (1992-1999)
 Wallonia -
 Robert Collignon (1994-1995)
 Jean-Pierre Grafé (1995-1996)
 Bosnia and Herzegovina -
Irfan Ljubijankić (1993-1995)
Muhamed Sacirbey (1995-1996)
Republika Srpska - Aleksa Buha (1992-1998)
 Bulgaria -
Stanislav Daskalov (1993-1995)
Georgi Pirinski, Jr. (1995-1996)
 Croatia - Mate Granić (1993-2000)
 Cyprus - Alekos Michaelides (1993-1997)
 Northern Cyprus - Atay Ahmet Raşit (1994-1996)
 Czech Republic - Josef Zieleniec (1992-1997)
 Denmark - Niels Helveg Petersen (1993-2000)
 Estonia -
Jüri Luik (1994-1995)
Riivo Sinijärv (1995)
Siim Kallas (1995-1996)
 Finland -
Heikki Haavisto (1993-1995)
Paavo Rantanen (1995)
Tarja Halonen (1995-2000)
 France -
Alain Juppé (1993-1995)
Hervé de Charette (1995-1997)
 Germany - Klaus Kinkel (1992-1998)
 Greece - Karolos Papoulias (1993-1996)
 Hungary - László Kovács (1994-1998)
 Iceland -
Jón Baldvin Hannibalsson (1988-1995)
Halldór Ásgrímsson (1995-2004)
 Ireland - Dick Spring (1994-1997)
 Italy -
Antonio Martino (1994-1995)
Susanna Agnelli (1995-1996)
 Latvia - Valdis Birkavs (1994-1999)
 Liechtenstein - Andrea Willi (1993-2001)
 Lithuania - Povilas Gylys (1992-1996)
 Luxembourg - Jacques Poos (1984-1999)
 Macedonia - Stevo Crvenkovski (1993-1996)
 Malta - Guido de Marco (1989-1996)
 Moldova - Mihai Popov (1994-1997)
 Netherlands - Hans van Mierlo (1994-1998)
 Norway - Bjørn Tore Godal (1994-1997)
 Poland -
Andrzej Olechowski (1993-1995)
Władysław Bartoszewski (1995)
Dariusz Rosati (1995-1997)
 Portugal -
José Manuel Barroso (1992-1995)
Jaime Gama (1995-2002)
 Romania - Teodor Meleşcanu (1992-1996)
 Russia - Andrey Kozyrev (1990-1996)
 Chechnya - Shamseddin Yusef (1992-1996)
 San Marino - Gabriele Gatti (1986-2002)
 Slovakia - Juraj Schenk (1994-1996)
 Slovenia - Zoran Thaler (1995-1996)
 Spain -
Javier Solana (1992-1995)
Carlos Westendorp (1995-1996)
 Sweden - Lena Hjelm-Wallén (1994-1998)
 Switzerland - Flavio Cotti (1993-1999)
 Ukraine - Hennadiy Udovenko (1994-1998)
 United Kingdom -
Douglas Hurd (1989-1995)
Malcolm Rifkind (1995-1997)
 Vatican City - Archbishop Jean-Louis Tauran (1990-2003)
 Yugoslavia -
Vladislav Jovanović (1993-1995)
Milan Milutinović (1995-1998)
 Montenegro -
 Miodrag Lekić (1992-1995)
 Janko Jeknić (1995-1997)

North America and the Caribbean
 Antigua and Barbuda - Lester Bird (1991-2004)
 The Bahamas - Janet Bostwick (1994-2002)
 Barbados - Billie Miller (1994-2008)
 Belize - Dean Barrow (1993-1998)
 Canada - André Ouellet (1993-1996)
 Quebec - Bernard Landry (1994-1996)
 Costa Rica - Fernando Naranjo Villalobos (1994-1998)
 Cuba - Roberto Robaina (1993-1999)
 Dominica -
Brian George Keith Alleyne (1990-1995)
Edison James (1995-1998)
 Dominican Republic - Carlos Morales Troncoso (1994-1996)
 El Salvador -
Óscar Alfredo Santamaria (1994-1995)
Ramón Ernesto González Giner (1995-1999)
 Grenada -
Nicholas Brathwaite (1992-1995)
Dennis Noel (1995)
Keith Mitchell (1995-1997)
 Guatemala -
Gladys Maritza Ruiz de Vielman (1994-1995)
Alejandro Maldonado Aguirre (1995-1996)
 Haiti -
Claudette Werleigh (1993-1995)
Fritz Longchamp (1995-2001)
 Honduras -
Ernesto Paz Aguilar (1994-1995)
Delmer Urbizo Panting (1995-1998)
 Jamaica -
Paul Robertson (1993-1995)
Seymour Mullings (1995-2000)
 Mexico - José Ángel Gurría (1994-1998)
 Nicaragua - Ernesto Leal (1992-1997)
 Panama - Gabriel Lewis Galindo (1994-1996)
 Puerto Rico –
Baltasar Corrada del Río (1993–1995)
Norma Burgos (1995–1999)
 Saint Kitts and Nevis -
Kennedy Simmonds (1983-1995)
Denzil Douglas (1995-2000)
 Saint Lucia - George Mallet (1992-1996)
 Saint Vincent and the Grenadines - Alpian Allen (1994-1998)
 Trinidad and Tobago -
Ralph Maraj (1991-1995)
Knowlson Gift (1995)
Gordon Draper (1995)
Ralph Maraj (1995-2000)
 United States - Warren Christopher (1993-1997)

South America
 Argentina - Guido di Tella (1991-1999)
 Bolivia - Antonio Araníbar Quiroga (1993-1997)
 Brazil -
Celso Amorim (1993-1995)
Luiz Felipe Palmeira Lampreia (1995-2001)
 Chile - José Miguel Insulza (1994-1999)
 Colombia - Rodrigo Pardo García-Peña (1994-1996)
 Ecuador - Galo Leoro Franco (1994-1997)
 Guyana - Clement Rohee (1992-2001)
 Paraguay - Luis María Ramírez Boettner (1993-1996)
 Peru -
Efrain Goldenberg (1993-1995)
Francisco Tudela (1995-1997)
 Suriname - Subhas Mungra (1991-1996)
 Uruguay -
Sergio Abreu Bonilla (1993-1995)
Álvaro Ramos Trigo (1995-1998)
 Venezuela - Miguel Ángel Burelli Rivas (1994-1999)

1995 in international relations
Foreign ministers
1995